Stacelynn Kehaulani Eli is an American politician who is the Hawaii state representative in Hawaii's 43rd district. She won the seat after incumbent Republican Andria Tupola decided to run for Governor of Hawaii. Her Republican opponent in the 2018 election, Sailau Timoteo, was disqualified from the general election ballot after it was discovered that she was not a United States citizen.

Eli's family has lived on the Nanakuli Homestead since the 1930s. A fifth-generation Nanakuli resident, she graduated from Nanakuli High and Intermediate School and has served on the Neighborhood Board and the board for the Nanakuli High and Intermediate Performing Arts Center.

Eli has also worked as a legislative aide for then-state Rep. Lynn DeCoite (D, Lanai-Molokai-Paia-Hana), former state Sen. Brickwood Galuteria (D, Kakaako-McCully-Waikiki) and former state Rep. Karen Awana.

References

Living people
Democratic Party members of the Hawaii House of Representatives
21st-century American politicians
Year of birth missing (living people)